Antonio Rivas Mercado (26 February 1853 – 3 January 1927) was a Mexican architect, engineer and restorer. His most notable project was the design of the Independence Column in downtown Mexico City. He was the father of Antonieta Rivas Mercado.

Rivas Mercado was born in Tepic in the then Territory of Tepic, but his parents decided to send him to study in Europe at the age of 10. Eventually, he studied Fine Arts and Architecture at the École des Beaux-Arts in Paris, France from where he returned to Mexico City in 1879 to practise as an architect and teach at the Schools of Engineering and Architecture (today part of the National Autonomous University of Mexico).

Among Rivas Mercado's various projects figure the house that eventually became the Wax Museum of Mexico City (1883); the restoration of haciendas of historical importance such as the Hacienda of Tecajete in the State of Hidalgo (1884), and Chapingo in the State of Mexico (1900); the customs building in Tlatelolco, (1884); the restoration of several government buildings including the facade of the Town Hall in Mexico City (1887); and his own house (1898) in Mexico City, now preserved as a historical building.

The Teatro Juárez in Guanajuato, which Rivas Mercado built between 1892 and 1903, is considered to be one of the finest buildings of the period. The neoclassical exterior and neo-moorish interior are a clear reflection of his eclectic architectural style. In 1902 he was commissioned by President Porfirio Díaz to design and build the Independence Column on occasion of the 100th anniversary of the beginning of the Mexican War of Independence. The project, which he realised in collaboration with sculptor Enrique Alciati, was finished in 1910, the same year as the anniversary.

Rivas Mercado was Director of the Escuela Nacional de Bellas Artes in Mexico City from 1903 to 1912. He instituted new methods of study and design and is said to have modified the curriculum of the "Architecture and Civil Engineering" major in order to make two different ones out of it. During his tenure he managed to raise enough money to fund Diego Rivera's scholarship to study painting in Europe. He moved back to Paris shortly after his tenure ended. However, he returned to Mexico in 1926 and died a few months later in Mexico City, aged 74.

On 26 February 2019, Google celebrated what would have been Mercado's 166th birthday with a Google doodle.

See also
Porfirio Díaz
El Ángel

References

External links

1853 births
1927 deaths
Mexican architects
Mexican civil engineers